Trent Reznor and Atticus Ross are the members of the American industrial rock band, Nine Inch Nails, founded in 1988, together they have made the score for several movies and television shows.  
In 2010 they composed the score for the biographical drama The Social Network marking their first collaboration with director David Fincher, who would become a recurrent collaborator, for their work in the film they won Best Original Score at the 83rd Academy Awards and Golden Globe Award for Best Original Score at the 68th Golden Globe Awards. The following year, they composed the music for the psychological crime thriller film The Girl with the Dragon Tattoo winning the Grammy Award for Best Score Soundtrack for Visual Media at the 55th Annual Grammy Awards. In 2014 the collaborated for the third time with David Fincher for the psychological thriller film Gone Girl. In 2019 they composed the music for the HBO limited series Watchmen''' and received nominations for Outstanding Music Composition for a Limited Series, Movie, or Special and Outstanding Original Music and Lyrics at the 72nd Primetime Emmy Awards winning the former. In 2020 they worked again with Fincher composing music for the biographical drama Mank, also they composed the music for the animated Pixar film Soul''.

Academy Awards
The Academy Awards are a set of awards given by the Academy of Motion Picture Arts and Sciences annually for excellence of cinematic achievements.

Annie Awards
The Annie Awards are presented annually by ASIFA-Hollywood to recognize excellence in animation.

British Academy Film Awards
The British Academy Film Award is an annual award show presented by the British Academy of Film and Television Arts.

Critics' Choice Movie Awards
The Critics' Choice Movie Awards are presented annually since 1995 by the Broadcast Film Critics Association for outstanding achievements in the cinema industry.

Golden Globe Awards
The Golden Globe Award is an accolade bestowed by the 93 members of the Hollywood Foreign Press Association (HFPA) recognizing excellence in film and television, both domestic and foreign.

Grammy Awards
The Grammy Award is an annual award show presented by The Recording Academy.

Hollywood Music in Media Awards
The Hollywood Music in Media Awards (HMMA) in an organization that honours the best in original music for media.

Primetime Emmy Awards
The Primetime Emmy Awards are presented annually by the Academy of Television Arts & Sciences, also known as the Television Academy, to recognize and honor achievements in the television industry.

Satellite Awards
The Satellite Awards are a set of annual awards given by the International Press Academy.

Critics associations

See also

Notes

References

Reznor and Ross